Mick Hickey may refer to:

 Mick Hickey (Waterford hurler) (1911–1998)
 Mick Hickey (Limerick hurler) (1912–1992)

See also
 Mike Hickey, baseball player
 Michael Hickey, screenwriter